Paseo del Bajo, officially named Brigadier General Juan Manuel de Rosas, is a highway in the city of Buenos Aires, Argentina. It joins the 25 de Mayo, Arturo Illia and Buenos Aires-La Plata highways.

It runs between Alicia M. de Justo, Ingeniero Huergo, Eduardo Madero, Antártida Argentina, and Ramón Castillo Avenues, through the barrios of Recoleta, Retiro, Puerto Madero, San Nicolás, Monserrat, San Telmo within the city of Buenos Aires. The freeway lanes are truck and bus only.

This highway is operated by "Autopistas Urbanas S.A." (AUSA), a limited company that builts and operates highways within the city of Buenos Aires. Its main shareholder is the Government of the City.

Overview 
The freeway consists of four lanes, and is for trucks and long-distance buses exclusively, with eight lanes on parallel streets for light vehicles (four on each side, northbound and southbound). It was inaugurated on 27 May 2019.

At north, Paseo del Bajo starts in Arturo Illia Highway, then running along Ramón S. Castillo Avenue near the port of Buenos Aires. It runs along Antártida Argentina, and Eduardo Madero / Alicia M. de Justo Avenues, with connections with Retiro bus and railway stations. The highway ends at south of the city, connecting to 25 de Mayo (at west) and Buenos Aires–La Plata Highways (at south). In Puerto Madero and San Telmo, Paseo del Bajo is overpassed by the extensions of Córdoba, Viamonte, Lavalle, Corrientes, Juan D. Perón, Moreno, Belgrano, Independencia, and Estados Unidos.

An average of 134,000 vehicles runs on Paseo del Bajo per day. It includes 15,326 trucks, 28,245 buses and 91,070 light vehicles.

Paseo del Bajo included a park, named "Parque del Bajo", located between Belgrano and Corrientes avenues (north-south) and Paseo Colón and Huergo avenues (west-east), with an extension of 102,000 m2.

Controversy 
Some allegations of corruptions were reported, accusing Chief of Government Horacio Rodriguez Larreta to favour a company owned by a cousin of Mauricio Macri (then President of Argentina), granting it concession for the works. The General Audit of Buenos Aires denounced that the process was irregular and corrupt in favour of IECSA, the company owned by Angelo Calcaterra, cousin of Macri, for AR$ 3 million.

The Audit reported surchargers of up to 513%. Nevertheless, Federal Judge Claudio Bonadío closed the case, acquitting Rodríguez Larreta and Guillermo Dietrich (Ministry of Transport) of all charges.

A minority of the funding was loaned from the CAF – Development Bank of Latin America.

Major intersections

Gallery

References

External links 

 Autopistas Urbanas, operator

Roads in Buenos Aires
Tourism in Argentina
Transport in Buenos Aires